Dobravlje is a settlement northeast of Tomaj in the Municipality of Sežana in the Littoral region of Slovenia.

References

External links

Dobravlje on Geopedia

Populated places in the Municipality of Sežana